Molle mit Korn is a German television series.

See also
List of German television series

External links
 

1989 German television series debuts
1989 German television series endings
German-language television shows
Television shows based on German novels
Television shows set in Berlin
Television series set in the 1940s
Das Erste original programming